Isabella Stewart may refer to:

Isabella, Countess of Lennox, married name Isabella Stewart
Isabella Stewart Gardner, American art collector and philanthropist
Isabella of Scotland, daughter of James I of Scotland